Midbody may refer to:
 The middle part of the body of an animal in zoology
 Midbody (cell biology), a transient organelle formed after mammalian cell division